The Lyon's Den is an American legal drama television series set in Washington, D.C. The legal drama starred Rob Lowe as a lawyer named Jack Turner, newly appointed as partner of a long-established law firm that, as the plot revealed, harbored some dark secrets; the series' title and firm's name are allusions to the surname of Lowe, who also served as executive producer. Much of the plot centered on the firm's internal politics and on Turner's attempts to uncover information on some of the firm's conspiracies while acting as the defense for some of the firm's higher-profile clients in a different case each episode.

The cast, headed by Lowe, also included Matt Craven, Elizabeth Mitchell, Kyle Chandler, Frances Fisher, and David Krumholtz.

The series premiered on the American television network NBC on September 28, 2003, but although thirteen episodes were ordered and produced, only six aired before NBC cancelled the series on November 30, 2003, due to low ratings. When the UK's channel Five bought the UK terrestrial TV rights to the series in 2004, it aired all thirteen episodes. Rob Lowe later stated that after finding out about the show's cancellation he and the show's producers decided to make the last episodes – which they were contractually obligated to make – as absurd as possible, including an "off the wall" and freakish ending.

Characters 
Character descriptions courtesy of Entertainment Weekly and The Blade
 John "Jack" Turner (Rob Lowe), "the most principled lawyer" working for the corrupt firm Lyons, Lacrosse, and Levine longtime friend
 Grant Rashton (Kyle Chandler), one of "amoral lawyers"
 Brit Hanley (Frances Fisher), Rashton's "evil secretary"
 Ariel Saxon (Elizabeth Mitchell), a lawyer recovering from alcoholism, hired by her lover Rashton to "discredit Jack"
 Jeff Fineman (David Krumholtz), Ariel Saxon's paralegal, who is attracted to her
 Terrance Christianson (James Pickens Jr.), one of "amoral lawyers"
 Harlan M. Turner (Rip Torn), the Washington, D.C. senator and Jack's father

Episodes

Production

Singer Jewel's casting 
In his memoir, Love Life, Lowe stated that he lobbied for singer-actress Jewel to be cast as his love interest in the show after seeing her performance Ang Lee's cult film Ride With The Devil. However, when she arrived on set there was no chemistry between the two and Jewel brought her then-boyfriend, rodeo star Ty Murray, to the set with her on the day the actors were to film a love scene. According to Lowe, Jewel appeared uncomfortable at having to kiss Lowe, and unsuccessfully asked if the scene could be removed.

Finally relenting by stating, "Let's just do this", Lowe said Jewel agreed to do the scene. Lowe stated: "But as we approached the kissing moment it became strained and it's never good when you can't trust that your fellow actor is on the same page... I pecked her on the lips; her mouth scrunched closed like you would do if someone was going to stick something unwanted into it, which I was not intending. I sort of moved my head from side to side to make it look real, like there was at least a dollop of energy or passion. 'Cut', said the director. Jewel looked at me and wiped the back of her hand across her lips like an American Sign Language version of 'Yuck'".

Jewel was one of the celebrities chosen to roast Rob Lowe in 2015. She joked that she had asked to write out the kiss with Lowe "because I knew where that mouth had been."

Cancellation and improvised ending 
Lowe said, in a May 9, 2014 appearance on the NPR radio gameshow Wait Wait Don't Tell Me, that he and the show's producers purposefully made all 13 episodes – which they were contractually obligated to make for possible DVD distribution – as absurd as possible. The last episode ended with Lowe's character being exposed as a serial killer by Grant Rushton (Kyle Chandler), whom he then kills before jumping to his death from the firm's office tower.

References

External links 
 
 Wait Wait Rob Lowe appearance and interview: https://www.npr.org/2015/04/11/398798395/brat-pack-member-rob-lowe-gets-quizzed-on-bratwurst

2003 American television series debuts
2003 American television series endings
2000s American drama television series
2000s American legal television series
NBC original programming
Television shows set in Washington, D.C.
Television series by 20th Century Fox Television